The 1997 Niue Common Roll by-election was held on February 15, 1997 to fill a vacant common roll seat in the Niue Assembly after the death of Toeono Tongatule. The seat was won by independent Billy Talagi, a former member of the Niue People's Party that defeated Toeono Tongatule's late wife, Tiva Tongatule, and Terry Magaoa Chapman.

Results

References

1997 elections in Oceania
1997 in Niue
By-elections to the Niue Assembly
Politics of Niue
February 1997 events in Oceania